Effort may refer to:

 Effort, Pennsylvania, a census-designated place in Monroe County, Pennsylvania, United States
 Effortfulness, the subjective experience of exertion when performing an activity
Effort (gamer), League of Legends pro-gamer

See also
 Work (disambiguation)
 Second Effort, a 1968 film
 Effort heuristic, a rule of thumb to measure quality by effort
 Effort values, part of the gameplay of Pokémon
 Da Costa's syndrome, also known as Effort syndrome, a type of psychosomatic disorder